Sergey Fedotov (born February 12, 1972) is a Russian former long-distance runner. He competed in the 1991, 1997 and 2000 IAAF World Cross Country Championships. He also won the 2005 California International Marathon.

Marathons

References

External links

1972 births
Living people
Russian male long-distance runners
Russian male cross country runners
Russian male marathon runners
Universiade medalists in athletics (track and field)
Universiade silver medalists for Russia
Medalists at the 1993 Summer Universiade
Russian Athletics Championships winners